Savino Bernardo Maria Cazzaro Bertollo O.S.M. (28 November 1924 – 13 August 2017) was an Italian prelate of the Catholic Church. He was archbishop of Puerto Montt in Chile from 1988 to 2001.

Biography
Cazzaro was ordained a priest on April 16, 1949. Pope Paul VI appointed him Vicar Apostolic of Aysén on December 10, 1963. He participated at the third and the fourth session of the Second Vatican Council until 1965. In February 1988, Cazzaro was appointed archbishop of Puerto Montt by Pope John Paul II. He retired from this post on February 27, 2001.

References

External links 
 Catholic Hierarchy 

1924 births
2017 deaths
Participants in the Second Vatican Council
20th-century Roman Catholic archbishops in Chile
21st-century Roman Catholic archbishops in Chile
20th-century Italian Roman Catholic priests
Italian Roman Catholic bishops in South America
Servite bishops
Servites
Italian expatriates in Chile
Roman Catholic archbishops of Puerto Montt